This is a list of characters from Engine Sentai Go-onger, a Japanese tokusatsu television drama that serves as the 32nd entry in the Super Sentai franchise. The series follows the titular team in their battles against the Gaiark Clan, who have conquered several Braneworlds and now seek to do the same to the Human World.

Main characters

Go-ongers
During the events of the crossover film Engine Sentai Go-onger vs. Gekiranger, after losing their Engine Souls, the Go-ongers learn the  fighting style to compensate for the brief loss of their transformation capabilities and gain the ability to perform the  finisher.

Sōsuke Esumi
, nicknamed the "Speed King", was a former race car driver who possesses a sunny disposition and was known amongst his racing team as "Miracle Esumi" for his belief in miracles. Unyielding to the point of obstinacy and confident to a fault, he confronts all obstacles without hesitation and is highly protective of his teammates. After defeating the Gaiark Clan, he returns to racing, albeit as a go-kart driver.

With two Rocket Daggers, Go-On Blue wielding the Cowl Laser, and Go-on Yellow wielding the Bridge Axe, Esumi can perform the  finisher.

With Geki Red and Rio, Esumi can perform the  attack. During the events of the crossover film Samurai Sentai Shinkenger vs. Go-onger: GinmakuBang!!, Go-on Red uses Shinken Red's Kyoryu Disk with the Mantan Gun to transform into , granting his weapon similar capabilities as the Kyoryumaru.

Renn Kōsaka
Over the course of the series, he builds or fine-tunes many of the Go-ongers' weaponry and helps the Engines combine into stronger forms. Following the Gaiark's defeat, Kōsaka becomes Esumi's mechanic in the go-kart racing circuit.

Utilizing a Go-Phone in conjunction with a Change Soul based on Engine Bus-on, Kōsaka can transform into . With the Mantan Gun, he can perform the  attack in its Rod Mode and the  attack in its Gun Mode. During the events of the crossover film Engine Sentai Go-onger vs. Gekiranger, he learns the Engine Fist move .

Saki Rōyama
, nicknamed the "Sweet Angel", was a concessions vendor who worked the stands of the Twin Ring Motegi racetrack and is known for cheerful, eager personality, which stemmed from an encounter with a woodland spirit who taught her to always "smile, smile". Following the Gaiark's defeat, Rōyama goes on to fulfill her dream of opening a cake shop.

Utilizing a Go-Phone in conjunction with a Change Soul based on Engine BearRV, Rōyama can transform into . With her fellow G3 Princess members, she can perform the  attack and the  finisher. With Go-on Silver, she can perform the  finisher. During the events of the crossover film Engine Sentai Go-onger vs. Gekiranger, she can perform the Engine Fist move .

Hanto Jō
, nicknamed the "Vagabond", is an enthusiastic, kind-hearted, but immature freeter working part-time at the Doki Doki Pizzeria who became a Go-onger after helping Gunpei Ishihara return the original Go-ongers' Engine Casts.

Utilizing a  brace in conjunction with a Change Soul based on Engine Birca, Jō can transform into . While transformed, he can perform the  attack. During the events of the crossover film Engine Sentai Go-onger vs. Gekiranger, he can perform the Engine Fist move .

Gunpei Ishihara
, nicknamed the "Chaser", is an insecure and buffoonish former police officer with excellent marksmanship and a passion for justice who tries to put on a cool and serious front. After witnessing the original Go-ongers during their initial battles with Gaiark, Ishihara quits the police force after they refuse to help. Upon discovering the Go-ongers' identities, he goes to extreme lengths to join them, going so far as to kidnap their ally, Bomper, and steal their Engine Casts. Upon learning of how they were chosen, Ishihara returns the casts and becomes a Go-onger. Following the Gaiark's defeat, Ishihara returns to the police force and becomes a detective.

Utilizing a Shift Changer in conjunction with a Change Soul based on Engine Gunpherd, Ishihara can transform into . During the events of the crossover film Engine Sentai Go-onger vs. Gekiranger, he can perform the Engine Fist move .

Go-on Wings
The  are an elite two-man fighting force composed of the Sutō siblings, who came from a Plutocratic lifestyle, They were chosen by the Wing Clan Engines because of their esper abilities and brought to Machine World to become the Go-on Wings under Engine Jum-bowhale's guidance before the Go-ongers came to be. Due to their training however, the siblings initially view the Go-ongers as too inexperienced to protect Earth until Jum-bowhale teaches the pair what truly makes the Go-ongers, leading to the Go-on Wings becoming their allies. After defeating the Gaiark Clan, the Sutō siblings resume their familial duties as members of high class society, though Hiroto was reluctant to do so.

Additionally, they can combine their Wing Triggers and Rocket Daggers to form the Wing Booster, which allows them to perform the  finisher alongside the Go-ongers. During the events of the crossover film Engine Sentai Go-onger vs. Gekiranger, it is revealed that the siblings learned the Geki Jūken Beast Arts fighting style from Gorie Yen.

Hiroto Sutō
, nicknamed the "Philosopher", is the cool and aloof leader of the Go-on Wings who is proficient in combat. He trains extensively in boxing and kickboxing, and possesses an esper ability that allows him to sense nearby danger. Despite his cold exterior, he possesses a fiery passion and a willingness to put his life on the line to protect those he cares about. Due to this, he became known as the Go-ongers' father figure.

Miu Sutō

, nicknamed the "Lovely Sensation", is Hiroto's younger sister with a "princessy" attitude, skill in aikido, and an esper ability that allows her to see things through the flowers she tends to. She displays an over-dependence on her brother, who she refers to as "ani", along with a desire to improve those she perceives as lesser than her. Over the course of the series, she develops a close friendship with Saki Rōyama and a hesitant crush on Sōsuke Esumi. Additionally, she temporarily breaks off from Hiroto to form the G3 Princess and Go-on Princess idol groups to defeat a separate foe on two separate occasions.

As Go-on Silver and alongside her fellow G3 Princess members, Miu can perform the G3 Triangle and Princess Cannonball. With her fellow Go-on Princess members, she can perform the Princess Triple Attack and the Princess Triple Punch. With Go-on Yellow, she can perform the Flower Cannonball.

Arsenal

: The combined form of Go-on Red, Blue, and Yellow's Go-on Gears.
: The personal weapon of Go-on Red, with which he can perform the  attack.
: The personal weapon of Go-on Yellow, with which she can perform the  attack.
: The combined form of Go-on Green and Black's Go-on Gears.
: The personal weapon of Go-on Green, with which he can perform the  attack.
: The personal weapon of Go-on Black, with which he can perform the  attack.
: The combined form of all five Go-ongers' Go-on Gears.
: The combination of the Go-on Wings' Wing Triggers and Rocket Daggers. 
: The Go-on Wings' transformation device which also serve as joysticks for piloting their Engines and SeikuOh.
: A wheel-like robot that Hiroto and Jum-bowhale invented. In a human-sized Wheel Mode, it can perform the  finisher. Additionally, the Engines' Souls are compatible with the Go-Roader GT, allowing them to effectively assume a humanoid form.
: A crossing gate-like weapon developed by Renn Kōsaka to utilize the ancient Engines' power that can switch between Rod Mode and Gun Mode and hold two Engine Souls at once.

Engines

Due to being unable to maintain their true giant sizes for longer than ten minutes without suffering from fatal rusting, they are forced to separate their Engine Souls from their  and choose the Go-ongers to assist them in keeping both safe. Through their bonds with their partners, the Engines are able to combine into stronger humanoid mecha forms.

With the Shinkengers' Origami, the Engines can perform the  attack.
 
 : Go-on Red's partner who resembles a racecar and a condor. While in his true size, he can perform the  attack, possesses incredible speed, and assume "Accel Full Throttle" mode, which allows him to glide and utilize his talons.
 : Go-on Blue's partner who resembles a bus and a lion.
 : Go-on Yellow's gutsy and spunky partner who resembles a Four-wheel drive truck and a bear. As a member of Go-on Princess, she can perform the Princess Triple Attack or Princess Triple Punch alongside her fellow members.
: Go-on Green's easy-going partner who resembles a motorcycle and an orca and displays a fondness for foreign words, having used Spanish, Italian, French, English, and Mandarin Chinese terms throughout the series. While in his true size, he wields the  tail.
: Go-on Black's justice seeking partner who resembles a police car and a German Shepherd. While in his true size, he possesses the  nose and expert marksmanship.
: A member of the powerful  of Engines who resembles a semi-trailer truck and an alligator and displays a samurai-esque personality. While in his true size, he can carry two Engines on his back and does not require a partner, though he requires the most time to recharge his Engine Soul.
: Go-on Gold's lively partner and a member of the rarely seen  of Engines who resembles a helicopter and a chicken. While in his true size, he possesses rotors and turrets armed with an infinite supply of energy bullets that allow him to perform the  attack.
: Go-on Silver's calm partner and a member of the Wing Race who resembles a fighter jet and a tiger. While in his true size, he possesses  cruise missiles and can perform the  attack.
: A veteran member of the Wing Race and the leader of the Wing Engines who resembles a Boeing 747 and a baleen whale. While in his true size, he can perform the  attack and assume a flying wing-like  for increased speed.
: A peaceful member of the  who resembles a steam locomotive and a mammoth and is incapable of speaking human languages due to arriving in the Human World, then called , during the Mesozoic to battle the Horonderthal before going into hibernation and reawakening in the present. While in his true size, he can perform the  attack.
: A primitive member of the Ancient Engines who resembles a Shinkansen and a Tyrannosaurus, is also incapable of speaking human languages, and displays an intense hatred for the Savage Machine Clans.
: A member of the Ancient Engines who resembles a Shinkansen and a Triceratops, is also incapable of speaking human languages, and specializes in breaking through enemy defenses with his horns.

Engine Combinations
The Engines can be assembled into larger mecha via .

Additionally, EngineOh can combine with other Engines through , which are as follows:
: The combination of EngineOh and Engine Birca that can perform the  finisher.
: The combination of EngineOh and Engine Gunpherd that can perform the  finisher.
: The combination of EngineOh and Engine Jetras that can perform the  finisher.
: The Go-ongers secondary mecha and the combination of Engines Birca, Gunpherd, and Carrigator that is nicknamed . Like EngineOh, GunBirOh can also combine with other Engines through Engine Armaments, which are as follows:
: The combination of Engines Gunpherd, Carrigator, and Toripter that can perform the  finisher.
: The combination of Engines Birca, Carrigator, and Jetras that can perform the  finisher.
: The combination of EngineOh and GunBirOh that can perform the  attack and the  finisher.
Like EngineOh and GunBirOh, SeikuOh can combine with other Engines through Engine Armaments, which are as follows:
: The combination of Engines Birca, Jetras, and Jum-bowhale that can perform the  finisher.
: The combination of Engines Gunpherd, Toripter, and Jum-bowhale that can perform the  finisher.
: The combination of EngineOh, GunBirOh and SeikuOh that can perform the  finisher.
During the events of the crossover film Engine Sentai Go-onger vs. Gekiranger, EngineOh G12 can perform the  finisher alongside the Gekirangers' mecha, SaiDaiGekiRinTohja.
: The combination of EngineOh G12 and the Shinkengers' mecha SamuraiHaOh that can perform the  finisher and appears exclusively in the crossover film Samurai Sentai Shinkenger vs. Go-onger: GinmakuBang!!
: The  of the Go-ongers and Go-on Wings' personal partners that can perform the  finisher. This formation appears exclusively in the anniversary film Engine Sentai Go-onger: 10 Years Grand Prix.

Recurring characters

Bomper
, short for "Born-to Outerdimension and Mechanic × Pitcrew-type ENGINE-support Robot", is a pink radar robot from Machine World who was created by Jum-bowhale and supports the Go-ongers by creating their arsenal and performing maintenance on the Engines.

Gaiark
The , are machine-men from the Machine World who seek to pollute the Braneworlds and whose numbers were scattered during their war with the Engines.

Pollution Ministers
Amidst their battle with Yogoshimacritein, the Go-ongers destroy the gear, causing Hellgailles Palace to self-destruct. During the events of the crossover film Samurai Sentai Shinkenger vs. Go-onger: GinmakuBang!!, the Pollution Ministers are rebuilt, but choose not to continue the Gaiark Clan's plans and run off to the bottom of the Sanzu River. As of the events of the anniversary film Engine Sentai Go-onger: 10 Years Grand Prix, the ministers settle down in Junk World, but accidentally give rise to the Zontark Clan and join forces with the Go-ongers to stop them.

Yogostein
After suffering a string of failures amidst his battles against the Go-ongers and losing his vice-minister, Hiramechimedes, whom he had total faith in, Yogostein goes into self-imposed exile to mourn and find himself before returning to personally seek violent revenge against the Go-ongers. Desiring the Horonderthal Clan's power, he awakens one of its members, lets the Go-ongers scrap it, and uses its parts to upgrade himself into the Horonderthal King in a failed attempt to kill Go-on Red and rust all of Japan. Despite his newfound power, he is weakened by EngineOh G12 and scrapped by Go-on Red in a final duel.

Kitaneidas
Amidst the Gaiark's war with the Engines, he experimented with Bikkurium's potent properties before using it on the Barbaric Machine Beasts. He arrives in the Human World with Yogostein and Kegalesia, but following the former's death, Yogoshimacritein's arrival, and being reduced to a living shield, a frustrated Kitaneidas and Kegalesia destroy the Bottomless Wastebin to weaken Yogoshimacritein, who scraps them in retaliation.

Kegalesia
Amidst the Gaiark's fight with the Go-ongers, Kegalesia briefly breaks off from her fellow ministers to form the G3 Princess idol group to defeat a separate foe. Following Yogostein's death and Yogoshimacritein reducing her to a living shield, Kegalesia leads the Go-ongers to the Deus Haguru Magear before helping Kitaneidas destroy the Bottomless Wastebin to weaken Yogoshimacritein, who scraps them in retaliation.

Due to her nature as a Water Pollution branch member, she can perform the  technique with any member of the same branch in order to boost both parties' power.

During the events of Engine Sentai Go-onger: 10 Years Grand Prix, amidst the Pollution Ministers' efforts to stop the Zontark Clan, Kegalesia borrows Go-on Yellow's transformation equipment and briefly transforms into .

Hiramechimedes
 is Yogostein's subordinate and the Gaiark's top tactical genius. Originally a second-rate inventor who developed much of the Gaiark's arsenal, he plotted to assassinate Yogostein and take his position. However, the latter recognized the former's brilliance and awarded him with the yardstick-like  sword and promoted him to Vice-Minister. This caused Hiramechimedes to loyally devote himself to Yogostein's cause and he would go on to inspire fear in the Engines after achieving numerous victories.

On the day the Gaiark were expelled from Machine World, Hiramechimedes disappeared to mount a failed attack on the Wing Clan Engines before resurfacing in the Human World months later to serve under Yogostein once more. When the Wing Engines pursue him and gain help from the Go-on Wings, Hiramechimedes stages his banishment from the Gaiark in a plot to deceive the Go-ongers and kill Go-on Gold. When the heroes foil him, an ashamed Hiramechimedes refuses to return to Yogostein and spends several days calculating a new plan to kill the Go-ongers. Eventually concluding he needs raw power instead of his intellect, he sneaks back into the Hellgailles Palace and infuses himself with one hundred times the Bikkurium required for a regular Barbaric Machine Beast to undergo an Industrial Revolution. However, the stress of his upgrade breaks his mind as he undergoes a "Big Industrial Revolution" and transforms into the insane . He overpowers the Go-ongers, but is eventually scrapped by Go-on Red.

Despite this, his grudge against the Go-ongers keeps him from passing on.

Hiramechimedes is voiced by Kazuya Nakai.

Yogoshimacritein
 is the Gaiark's  and Yogostein's father who wields a two-headed Kanabō-like weapon. As the most ruthless member of the Gaiark Clan, he desired to rule over all of the Braneworlds, having oversaw the near-extinction of the Engines' Gian Race and the destruction of three Braneworlds. After Kireizky arrives in the Human World, Yogoshimacritein uses the former's Bottomless Wastebin to enter the Human World himself and use it to power his  attack, which can convert targets into wavelengths so long as the Deus Haguru Magear is active. When he uses his  ability to turn Kitaneidas and Kegalesia into his puppets and reveals his willingness to sacrifice them, the Pollution Ministers assist the Go-ongers in destroying the Bottomless Wastebin and the Deus Haguru Magear to weaken Yogoshimacritein. He destroys his traitorous subordinates and utilizes the  ability to enlarge himself, but is scrapped by EngineOh G12.

Yogoshimacritein is voiced by Kiyoyuki Yanada, who also voices Yogostein.

Other members
: Preceding the Gaiark as the Engines' mortal enemies, the Arelunbra Family were sea-based androids who terrorized Machine World with their  before their leader Nigorl left for the Human World and the Arelunbra faded into legend.
: A servant of Nigorl who is armed with a jousting lance and shield with the ability to consume anything. After arriving in the Human World with Nigorl, Uzumaquixote became exposed to its clean surroundings, miniaturized, and trapped as a stone statue that a young Renn Kōsaka would find, assuming it to be a  statue. In the present, the Gaiark and Go-on Wings discover and fight over the statue until Kegalesia revives Uzumaquixote and has him attack the Go-ongers. After ingesting Bikkurium and enlarging himself, Uzumaquixote is scrapped by SeikuOh, GunBirOh, and EngineOh.
Unlike other Gaiark members, he displays a liking towards things he considers beautiful. After pining for and being spurned by Kegalesia, he arrived in the Human World, but entered suspended animation. The Gaiark revive Nigorl in the present, who turns his affections towards BearRV and attempts to marry her. Using his Water Pollution Fusion ability, he enlarges himself without Bikkurium and forcibly interfaces with Kegalesia to transform into , with Kegalesia as a battery to increase his power. Despite this, he is defeated by the Go-ongers and left to die by Kegalesia.
: A clan of ancient, giant clockwork Savage Machine Beasts that caused the extinction of the dinosaurs on Earth 65 million years ago with their violence-inducing  attack. The Ancient Engines battled the Horonderthal until they and an individual clan member were fossilized within a mountain. In the present, Yogostein seeks out the Horonderthal and eventually succeeds despite freeing the Ancient Engines as well. After Yogostein upgrades the Horonderthal with modern Gaiark technology, it defeats the Ancient Engines, but is scrapped by EngineOh G12 while Yogostein claims the Horonderthal's power for himself.
: A Gaiark minister who "cleans" the slate of Braneworlds he has visited in order to acquire a special form of energy called . However, the Wastebin would later allow Yogoshimacritein to enter the Human World.
: Yogoshimacritein's boiler-themed right-hand and practitioner of the  fighting style. Chirakasonne ingests Dokkirium and enlarges, but is scrapped by GunBirOh.

Arsenal
: Android foot soldiers built to support the Barbaric Machine Beasts and pilot the Barbaric Dohmas. Additionally, Nigorl possesses a feminine variant called , which are stronger than regular Ugatz. During the events of the crossover film Samurai Sentai Shinkenger vs. Go-onger: GinmakuBang!!, Batcheed utilizes Ugatz capable of transforming into motorcycles.
: Cave cricket-like jet fighters invented by Hiramechimedes that can assume a frog-like walking mode.
: Cave cricket and mantis-like jet fighters that serve as Hiramechimedes and the Pollution Minsters' personal transports that are each able to carry up to four Barbaric Dohma.

Barbaric Machine Beasts
The Barbaric Machine Beasts are infused with a special energy called  that is capable of enlarging them in a process called  and are based on machines or inventions that were present at the turn of the twentieth century. If they are scrapped, the dead Savage Machine Beasts shrink back to normal size and end up at the Savage Machine Beast Graveyard. In the film Engine Sentai Go-onger: Boom Boom! Bang Bang!

Savage Land Barbaric Machine Beasts
: A shovel-themed Barbaric Machine Beast equipped with shovel-like gauntlets. He is sent by Yogostein to attack Neo Tokyo Hills, only to be defeated by the Go-ongers. Scoop Banki enlarges, but is scrapped by EngineOh.
: A magnet-themed Barbaric Machine Beast capable of manipulating electromagnetic forces. He is sent by Yogostein to attack the Go-ongers, who manage to defeat him. Following this, Jishaku Banki is upgraded into the electromagnet-themed  and uses his increased power to overwhelm the Go-ongers until Go-on Green destroys his power source. Denjishaku Banki enlarges, but is scrapped by EngineOh Birca.
: A boring machine-themed Barbaric Machine Beast sent by Yogostein to destroy Japan by extracting magma, only to be defeated by the Go-ongers. Boring Banki enlarges, but is scrapped by EngineOh and GunBirOh.
: An electric generator-themed Barbaric Machine Beast who possesses electrokinesis. Following a mishap wherein he accidentally switches bodies with Go-on Red before the Go-ongers reverse the process, Hatsuden Banki enlarges, but is weakened by a cold that Go-on Red was suffering from and scrapped by EngineOh G6.
: A dynamite-themed Barbaric Machine Beast and Yogostein's "number one hooligan" with destructive capabilities. Yogostein sends him to destroy the city, but is foiled by the Go-on Wings. Despite receiving help from Yogostein and Hiramechimedes, Happa Banki is scrapped by Go-on Gold, who takes his Bikkurium to prevent him from enlarging.
: A saw-themed Barbaric Machine Beast equipped with a saw blade arm capable of cutting through any material. He is sent by Yogostein to attack the city, but he focuses on attacking objects that are taller than him instead until the Go-ongers exploit the loose bolt holding his saw arm together. Nokogiri Banki enlarges, but is scrapped by EngineOh G6. Following this, Hiramechimedes collects his remains, rebuilds him into the stronger  to remove his weaknesses, and tasks him with attacking the Go-ongers and Go-on Wings while polluting the skies. However, Jum-bowhale thwarts Chainsaw Banki's plans. The latter enlarges, but is scrapped by SeikuOh.
: A spinning mule-themed Barbaric Machine Beast capable of firing streams of yarn to immobilize targets. She is tasked by Yogostein with aiding Hiramechimedes in staging a false attempt on his life. After undergoing an  however, she is scrapped by EngineOh G9.
: A namesake-themed Barbaric Machine Beast that Yogostein infused with his hatred. As a result, the former is compelled to destroy everything in sight, to the point of disobeying Yogostein. Hammer Banki enlarges, but is scrapped by EngineOh G9 and the Go-Roader GT.
: A namesake-themed Barbaric Machine Beast and the strongest  of the Savage Land models armed with a drill horn. He is sent by Yogostein to locate the Horonderthal, only to accidentally awaken the Ancient Engines. Drill Banki enlarges, but is scrapped by KyoretsuOh.

Savage Sky Barbaric Machine Beasts
: An incinerator-themed Barbaric Machine Beast capable of placing objects in his forehead furnace and converting it into smog for use in his attacks, with flowers and any objects he considers pretty improving the smog's toxicity. He is sent by Kitaneidas to use his abilities on Japan, but is foiled by the Go-ongers, forcibly enlarged by the Pollution Ministers, and scrapped by EngineOh.
: A namesake-themed Barbaric Machine Beast capable of converting beautiful sound waves into noise pollution with his microphone spear before producing the resulting sound waves from his speakers. After receiving an upgrade that allows him to generate a sound barrier capable of blocking most attacks, Speaker Banki enlarges, only to be scrapped by EngineOh Gunpherd.
: A camera lens-themed Barbaric Machine Beast capable of teleporting targets to the Braneworld of Junk World and utilizing the Braneworld's ability to mechanize people. Kitaneidas creates Lens Banki to assist in his plan to create new Ugatz. Despite enlarging and being scrapped by EngineOh and GunBirOh, Lens Banki takes pictures of the mecha, which the Pollution Ministers incorporate into Kagami Banki.
: A namesake-themed Barbaric Machine Beast capable of firing lasers and interfering with television signals and replacing them with his own hypnotic signals capable of forcing people to pollute their surroundings. He is sent by Kitaneidas to drive the Go-ongers apart, only to be thwarted by the latter. Antenna Banki enlarges, but is scrapped by GunBirOh.
: A vacuum cleaner-themed Barbaric Machine Beast. He is sent by Kitaneidas to kill the Go-on Wings, only to be defeated by them and Go-on Red. Vacuum Banki enlarges, but is scrapped by EngineOh Jetripter.
: A balloon-themed Barbaric Machine Beast nicknamed the "Tiger of Balloons" who possesses a rubbery body that makes him immune to physical attacks, the ability to inflate targets, and weaponized smog-filled balloons. He is sent by Kitaneidas to distribute his balloons to children, but the Go-on Wings foil his plot. Fūsen Banki enlarges, but is scrapped by SeikuOh.
: A dowsing rod-themed Barbaric Machine Beast who wields a pair of tonfa that double as dowsing rods. She is sent by Kitaneidas to locate an object that landed in the mountains and distract the Go-ongers while he uses the object to bury the Human World in trash. She enlarges, but is scrapped by EngineOh G9.
: A namesake-themed Barbaric Machine Beast who wields the  batons. He is sent by Kitaneidas to cause heat waves and target Japan's gas tanks, only to be foiled by the Go-ongers. Heater Banki enlarges, but is scrapped by KyoretsuOh.
: A giant namesake/truck-themed Barbaric Machine Beast created to resemble EngineOh who possesses a trucker-esque personality and the ability to transform into a gas guzzling dekotora. He is sent by Kitaneidas to avenge Yogostein by polluting the Human World with his exhaust fumes. However, Engine Banki is shrunk by Go-on Gold via the Kankanbar and scrapped by Go-on Red via the Kankan Mantan Gun.
: A namesake-themed Barbaric Machine Beast that Kitaneidas tasks with capturing children for the latter's plot to subjugate the world to endless festive fun before tasking him with capturing two boys from the Braneworld of Samurai World instead. Yatai Banki enlarges, but is scrapped by EngineOh, GunBirOh, and SeikuOh.
: A namesake-themed Barbaric Machine Beast built to be the strongest of the Savage Sky models capable of polluting the air with carbon dioxide through his heavy breathing and aided by a pair of Ugatz who remotely operate his arms, which he cannot lift by himself. He enlarges, but is scrapped by SeikuOh and the Go-Roader GT.

Savage Water Barbaric Machine Beasts
: A drainage pipe-themed Barbaric Machine Beast capable of producing sludge from his pipework body. Kegalesia sends him to test his powers at a dam before he enlarges to pollute Shindaiba, only for the latter to be scrapped by EngineOh.
: A clumsy yet overeager spray bottle-themed Barbaric Machine Beast capable of shooting acid from his mouth. He is sent by Kegalesia to steal Birca's Engine Cast, only to be wounded by his target and Gunpherd. Spray Banki enlarges, but is scrapped by EngineOh.
: A gas cylinder-themed Barbaric Machine Beast capable of firing a Red Rust Beam. Kegalesia sends him to eliminate EngineOh, but is thwarted by Carrigator. Refusing to give up, he allows himself to be defeated in order to enlarge and try again, only to be scrapped by GunBirOh.
: A trigger-themed Barbaric Machine Beast who is reputed to be the Gaiark Clan's top sniper. Kegalesia sends him to capture an alien girl named Būkorin and bring her back to her father Gego in exchange for weapons, only to be defeated by the Go-ongers. Hikigane Banki enlarges, but is scrapped by EngineOh G6.
: A bath heater-themed Barbaric Machine Beast capable of shrinking and teleporting people to the miniature hot springs on his head via mist emitted from his nostrils. He is sent by Kegalesia to remove any interference to the Gaiark Clan's operations, during which he gains increased power after attaining enlightenment. Despite this, he is defeated by a love-filled Go-on Green. Kama Banki enlarges, but is scrapped by EngineOh G6.
: A namesake-themed Barbaric Machine Beast capable of producing slippery oil slick that can incapacitate normal vehicles and the land-based Engines. After being defeated by Toripter and Jetras, Hiramechimedes gives Oil Banki wings in order to combat them. Despite enlarging, EngineOh and GunBirOh use giant mops to scrap Oil Banki.
: A manhole cover-themed Barbaric Machine Beast capable of moving at superhuman speed and shooting manhole covers. Kegalesia sends him to kidnap pen spinners as part of Kitaneidas' plan to power his Destructive Sound Machine and destroy the city. Manhole Banki enlarges, but is scrapped by EngineOh G9.
: A drinking straw-themed Barbaric Machine Beast capable of forcing targets to breathe out poisonous gas and three bottles that grant the ability to produce explosive soap bubbles, a smokescreen, and a bubble prison. Kegalesia develops a drink capable of enhancing his abilities and evil tendencies, but Straw Banki is defeated by Go-on Red and Speedor via the Go-Roader GT. Straw Banki enlarges, but is scrapped by BearRV, Bus-on, SeikuOh, and GunBirOh.
: A namesake-themed Barbaric Machine Beast created by Kegalesia with the intention of producing acid rain, only to temporarily freeze men and sentient male organisms instead. Upon realizing what happened, Kegalesia gives Shower Banki "Super Ultra Gorgeous Acid Rain" and tasks her with killing the male Go-ongers, only for the latter to be defeated by Go-on Yellow and Silver and BearRV via the Go-Roader GT. Shower Banki enlarges, but is scrapped by GunBirOh Jetras and SeikuOh Gunpherd.
: A weak bottle-themed Barbaric Machine Beast who can produce hot water. In light of his weakness, Kegalesia manipulates Manabu Yushima into upgrading Bin Banki into the magic-capable, thermos-themed . After being depowered and enlarging however, Mahōbin Banki is scrapped by KyoretsuOh.

Savage Land/Sky/Water Barbaric Machine Beasts
 : A mirror-themed Barbaric Machine Beast created by all three Pollution Ministers who is capable of reflecting the Engines' attacks via Lens Banki's pictures. After being upgraded with extra Bikkurium and enlarging, Kagami Banki is scrapped by EngineOh G6.
: A draconic, chimeric Barbaric Machine Beast that Kitaneidas and Kegalesia modeled after all of its Barbaric Machine Beast predecessors, whose powers Kettei Banki is capable of utilizing. Kettei Banki enlarges, but is scrapped by EngineOh, KyoretsuOh, and SeikuOh.

Other Barbaric Machine Beasts
: A microphone-themed Savage Sky Barbaric Machine Beast who is scrapped by EngineOh and appears exclusively in the special drama sessions of the first Engine Sentai Go-onger soundtrack.
: A sludge-themed Savage Water Barbaric Machine Beast who is scrapped by EngineOh and GunBirOh and appears exclusively in the special drama sessions of the first Engine Sentai Go-onger soundtrack.
: An excavator-themed Savage Land Barbaric Machine Beast who is scrapped by EngineOh G6 and appears exclusively in the Engine Sentai Go-onger tie-in manga.
: A Barbaric Machine Beast who appears exclusively in the stage show .
: A namesake-themed Savage Land/Air/Water Barbaric Machine Beast created by Rin Jūken Akugata engineer Meka capable of performing Ringi fighting techniques. After receiving the Dōkokugan Soul, Nunchaku Banki gains increased power until he is defeated by Go-on Red and Geki Red and possessed by Long.

Guest characters
: A Braneworld that resembles Feudal Japan and was under the dictatorship of Empress Maki and her Yōma until the Go-ongers end up in the Braneworld by accident and help overthrow her during the events of the film Engine Sentai Go-onger: Boom Boom! Bang Bang! GekijōBang!!. The Go-ongers would later learn that Samurai World contains doppelgangers of Human World inhabitants, with the corresponding pairs' souls being linked to each other.
: A deforestation-themed Yōma recruited by the spectral Urameshimedes to help him kill the Go-ongers in exchange for being allowed to destroy Human World's forests. Urameshimedes later possesses Bakki to fulfill his revenge, but the latter is killed by EngineOh G9.
 and : A pair of crimson Yōma and Maki's servants, the former a leonine monster who wields a kusarigama/kusarifundo-esque weapon and the latter an ursine monster who wields sharp claws and a large shuriken. Following Maki's death, they pursue a pair of brothers from their world to the Human World to steal the Engine Sword and use Engine Dai-Shogun for evil. After the Go-ongers foil their plan, the Yōma ingest Bikkurium to execute their  enlargement technique, only to be killed by Engine Dai-Shogun.
 and : Young brothers who came to the Human World to protect the Engine Sword.
She travels to the Human World and assumes a human form after being deceived by Kitaneidas into thinking that her Braneworld was in danger of an invasion from the Human World and use her machine to give the Gaiark Clan an advantage. After meeting Hanto Jō and seeing his kindness however, she reverses her machine's polarity and helps the Go-ongers defeat the Gaiark before returning to Junk World.
: A monster from the Braneworld of  who comes to the Human World to feed on its noises, growing in size in the process. Due to the threat of it becoming large enough to crush Earth, the Go-ongers and Gaiark make repeated attempts to shrink it via a beautiful sound, only to fail until Saki Rōyama, Miu Sutō, and Kegalesia form the G3 Princess idol group in order to destroy Lumbiaco.
After ending up in the Human World due to the Gaiark Clan's influence, Hiroto Sutō finds a Wameikle egg, with the hatching creature imprinting on him. Due to Gaiark attacks, the baby immediately grows into its adult form and goes on a rampage before using its high-pitched sonic cries to break the dimensional barrier between the Human World and Stormy World. Once Hiroto calms it down, Wameikle returns to its native Braneworld.
After using his laptop to decipher the spell book and falling in love with Miu Sutō, Yushima attempts to win her over by magically infusing Bin Banki with magical powers. While working with Miu to de-power Bin Banki however, Yushima accidentally destroys his laptop.
Using the  he carries with him, Santa can take out presents from Christmas World and bring them into other Braneworlds.

Spin-off exclusive characters
: The heartless ruler of Samurai World who commands of army of Yōma to terrorize her Braneworld and appears exclusively in the film Engine Sentai Go-onger: Boom Boom! Bang Bang! GekijōBang!!. She attained her power after tricking the Honōshū into separating themselves from their Engine Casts, which she used to purge herself and Samurai World's denizens of all feelings except for rage and violence. However, the Go-ongers stumble onto her tyranny, with Go-on Red joining forces with the Honōshū to defeat her. In retaliation, she fuses herself with Retsu-Taka's cast to transform into a giant centipede-headed hydra until Go-on Red recovers the cast, forcing Maki into her true form before she is killed by Engine Dai-Shogun.
 and : Two of Maki's strongest Yōma who were created from Shishi-no-Shin and Tsuki-no-Wa's respective Engine Casts and can assume vehicle forms as a result. Individually, Raiken is a blue leonine monster who wields a kusarigama/kusarifundo-esque weapon while Gokumaru is a golden ursine monster who wields sharp claws and a large shuriken. The pair assist Maki in her tyranny until they are killed by Go-on Blue, Yellow, Green, and Black and the Go-on Wings.
: Three Samurai World Engines and the counterparts of Engines Speedor, Bus-on, and BearRV who lost their Engine Casts and hearts to Maki's magic and appear exclusively in the film Engine Sentai Go-onger: Boom Boom! Bang Bang! GekijōBang!!. In an attempt to gain the strength needed to fight back and restore themselves, their souls assumed human forms called . After encountering the Go-ongers, the Honōshū successfully regain their casts and utilize the  technique to merge into the Samurai World equivalent of the Go-ongers' EngineOh, which wields the flaming . After defeating Maki however, the trio exhaust their energy, causing their souls to fade away while their casts turn to stone.
Prior to forming Engine Dai-Shogun, he transferred part of his soul into the Engine Sword and entrusted it to two brothers to ensure his Engine Cast can never be used for evil.
Everyone GO-ON!!. He challenges Go-On Red in an attempt to avenge his younger brother. After being defeated however, Kokorootomedes upgrades himself into a berserker form with a Yakuza-inspired personality that allows him to utilize a dirty fighting style, only to be scrapped by Go-on Red via the Kankan Mantan Gun. Kokorootomedes is voiced by Kazuya Nakai, who also voices Hiramechimedes.
: The new leader of Gaiark who appears exclusively in the crossover film Samurai Sentai Shinkenger vs. Go-onger: GinmakuBang!!. After enlarging himself and combining with the Batchrium Plant, he is scrapped by the Go-ongers and Shinkengers' Samurai Formation 23.
: A clan born from Junk World's electronic waste and the revived Gaiark Pollution Ministers who had conquered the Braneworld three years prior to the events of Engine Sentai Go-onger: 10 Years Grand Prix. 
: The leader of Zontark who assumes a human form called , Japan's Minister of Defense. However, the Go-ongers foil his schemes and, after he enlarges, scrap him with EngineOh G7.
: The deputy leader of Zontark who assumes a human form called , the leader of a special police force. He is scrapped by Go-on Green and Black.

Notes

References

Super Sentai characters
Fictional robots
Tokusatsu television series